Alkham may refer to:

 Alkham, village in Kent, England.
 John Alkham (1354-c.1433), member of Parliament for Dover.
 Alkham Valley, valley in the Kent Downs, England.